Pnivne is a village in the Kamin-Kashyrskyi Raion (district) of Volyn Oblast (province) of western Ukraine. It has a population of 583 persons.

Villages in Kamin-Kashyrsky Raion